The Right to Love is a 1930 German silent drama film directed by Jacob Fleck and Luise Fleck and starring Georg Alexander, Evelyn Holt, and Georgia Lind. The film addresses the issue of the rights of ex-soldiers made impotent by war wounds to get married. It is in the Weimar tradition of Enlightenment films.

Cast
In alphabetical order

References

Bibliography

External links

1930 films
1930 drama films
German drama films
Films of the Weimar Republic
German silent feature films
German black-and-white films
Films directed by Jacob Fleck
Films directed by Luise Fleck
Silent drama films
1930s German films
1930s German-language films